The following is a summary of the 2019–20 season of competitive football in Switzerland.

National teams

Men's national team

UEFA Euro 2020 qualifying

Women's national team

UEFA Women's Euro 2022 qualifying

Friendly matches

League season

Raiffeisen Super League

Brack.ch Challenge League

Swiss Cup

Swiss clubs in Europe

UEFA Champions League

Qualifying phase and play-off round

Second qualifying round

|}

Third qualifying round

|}

Play-off round

|}

UEFA Europa League

Qualifying phase and play-off round

Second qualifying round

|}

Third qualifying round

|}

Group stage

Group B

Group C

Group G

Knockout phase

Round of 32

|}

Round of 16

|}

Quarter-finals

|}

UEFA Women's Champions League

Knockout phase

Round of 32

|}

References

 
Seasons in Swiss football